A box cutter or utility knife is a knife used for general or utility purposes.

Box cutter, Boxcutter, or Boxcutters may refer to:

 Box Cutter (Breaking Bad), season four premiere episode of the American television drama series Breaking Bad.
 Boxcutter (musician), an electronic musician from Northern Ireland.
 Vinnie Paz, an Italian American rapper also known as Boxcutter Pazzy.
 Boxcutters (podcast), an Australian podcast dedicated to the discussion of television.